Aly Mallé (born 3 April 1998) is a Malian professional footballer who plays as a left winger for Süper Lig club Keçiörengücü.

Club career
Born in Bamako, Mallé began his senior career with AS Black Stars. In July 2015 he went on a trial at 1. FC Köln, but nothing came of it.

Mallé agreed to a contract with Watford F.C. late in February 2016, and officially joined the Hornets on 29 July.

Immediately after joining Watford Mallé was loaned to Granada CF, being initially assigned to the reserves in Segunda División B. He made his debut for the B-side on 4 September, coming on as a late substitute in a 2–1 home win against La Roda CF.

Mallé scored his first goal in Spain on 1 October 2016, but in a 2–1 away loss against Real Murcia. He made his first team – and La Liga – debut on 21 January 2017, starting in a 1–3 defeat at RCD Espanyol.

On 2 June 2017, following Granada's relegation, Mallé signed a five-year contract with Udinese. The following 6 January, after making no appearances for the club, he was loaned to Segunda División side Lorca FC until June.

Mallé scored his first professional goal on 20 January 2018, netting the first after 18 seconds in a 3–2 home loss against SD Huesca.

On 16 January 2019, Mallé joined to Grasshoppers on loan with an option to buy. In September 2019, udinese agreed on a loan with Balikesirspor for one year.

On 19 September 2020, he signed a multi-year contract with Ascoli.
His contract with Ascoli was terminated by mutual consent on 27 January 2021.

On 1 February 2021, he signed for Yeni Malatyaspor for two and half years.

International career
Mallé was included in Mali under-17 squad for the 2015 FIFA U-17 World Cup hosted in Chile. He was elected the Bronze Ball of the tournament, after being an undisputed starter and scoring two goals and providing two assists.

Mallé was also included in the 30-man list ahead of the 2016 African Nations Championship, but was cut from the final squad.

Honours
Mali U17
FIFA U-17 World Cup runner-up: 2015

Individual
FIFA U-17 World Cup Bronze Ball: 2015

References

External links

1998 births
Living people
Sportspeople from Bamako
Malian footballers
Association football wingers
Mali youth international footballers
Watford F.C. players
La Liga players
Segunda División players
Segunda División B players
Serie A players
Serie B players
Swiss Super League players
Süper Lig players
Club Recreativo Granada players
Granada CF footballers
Lorca FC players
Udinese Calcio players
Grasshopper Club Zürich players
Ascoli Calcio 1898 F.C. players
Yeni Malatyaspor footballers
Büyükşehir Belediye Erzurumspor footballers
Ankara Keçiörengücü S.K. footballers
Malian expatriate footballers
Malian expatriate sportspeople in Spain
Malian expatriate sportspeople in Italy
Malian expatriate sportspeople in Switzerland
Malian expatriate sportspeople in Turkey
Expatriate footballers in Spain
Expatriate footballers in Italy
Expatriate footballers in Switzerland
Expatriate footballers in Turkey
21st-century Malian people